Eternal Love is the fifth single by PJ & Duncan, taken from their debut album Psyche (1994). It reached number 12 on the UK Singles Chart and spent eight weeks in the top 40.

Track listing
CD single (CDANT3)

CD single (CDDEC3)

Chart performance

Weekly Charts

References
1. https://www.youtube.com/watch?v=1jbe_Zyz508
2. http://www.discogs.com/PJ-Duncan-Eternal-Love/release/3688408

1994 singles
Ant & Dec songs
Pop ballads
1994 songs
Telstar Records singles
Songs written by Nick Graham (musician)